Tresco West is a locality located in the 'Lakes' Ward of the Rural City of Swan Hill, Victoria, Australia. Tresco West post office opened on 8 January 1923 and was closed on the 11 November 1925.

References

Towns in Victoria (Australia)
Rural City of Swan Hill